Jacques Romberg was a Swiss footballer. He played in five matches for the Switzerland national football team from 1928 to 1930. He was also part of Switzerland's squad for the football tournament at the 1928 Summer Olympics, but he did not play in any matches.

References

External links
 

Year of birth missing
Year of death missing
Swiss men's footballers
Switzerland international footballers
Place of birth missing
Association football forwards
FC Aarau players
FC Zürich players